Salome MC (Persian: سالومه ام‌سی, born 1985), is an Iranian rapper, producer, antimilitarist activist and multimedia artist. Known as Iran's first female rapper, she has been recognized as one of the best non-English-speaking hip-hop artists by MTV and Time magazine listed her as one of the world's best rappers who are revolutionizing the world of rap. She is also a multimedia/video artist and her work has been featured in festivals, galleries and universities around the world, such as Venice Biennale and Yale University. In 2020, Salome founded "Seven Climes", a grassroots art and heritage project that presents the cultural and lingual diversity of the Iranian Hiphop scene.

Activities

Music 
Salome started her music career by collaborating with Hichkas, one of the currently prominent Iranian rappers, in 2002. With German-Iranian rapper Shirali, she released the collaboration album Delirium in 2006, and, in 2009, a mixtape called Paranoid Descent, which put her in the list of finalists for the Freedom to Create Prize in 2010. In 2013, she released I Officially Exist, the first hip-hop album by a female Iranian hip-hop artist, and its first music video, "Price of Freedom", was crowdfunded to be produced by Sahar Sarshar.

Salome Mc 2015 Warp and Weft Feat Koohsar Mc In 2015, she collaborated with Japanese rap artist Shing02 for a worldwide recording project called 1+1, and the resulting documentary, Passenger, was released in March 2016. She was also one of the participants in the remake project of Fela Kuti's album, Zombie, featuring Seun Kuti.

She announced her self-produced upcoming album Excerpts From Unhappy Consciousness (ناخوشاگاه) in 2016 and debuted the first song "Odium" (رسوا) at the Music Freedom Day festival 2016 in Norway. The music video for "Odium" was released in October 2016, followed by the second single from the album called "Callous". The album was released in August 2017 digitally, and consists of 8 tracks. In summer of 2018, Salome released her self-directed music video for the last single from the album called "Riddle", while pregnant with her son. Her song "3" was published in the subsequent year along with a personal essay named "Anxiety, Alienation and Control" on an Iranian feminist website. A regular collaborator with artists from around the world, her 2020 release "Home" featuring Tunisian rapper Medusa TN debuted on KEXP Radio.

Salome founded "Seven Climes", a grassroots art and heritage project that presents the cultural and lingual diversity of the Iranian Hiphop scene, and aims to connect the regional communities through their common love for creating social change through rap music. The first result of the endeavor, "Seven Climes Vol. 1" was released in April 2021.

She is the recipient of 2009 female change maker award and 2018 Artist Trust Fellowship award.

Writing
In 2016, Salome MC wrote an article called "Another Face of Censorship" for Siamak Pourzand Foundation's website, in which she lamented the biased reporting of Western outlets about Middle Eastern women, White feminism and neocolonialism. She interviewed A1one, also known as Karen Reshad, the pioneer of street art in the Middle East for Kolah Studio website in May 2018. Another essay of hers named "Anxiety, Alienation and Control", which she details her postpartum anxiety experience, was published on, Bidarzani, an Iranian feminist website in June 2019.

Sound and video art
Salome MC started working as a sound and video art while getting her master's degree in audio/visual arts in Japan. Her work has been screened and exhibited at various festivals around the world, including Swatch's "Faces" exhibit at the 2015 Venice Biennale with her music video "Vacuum," which features Don Porcella. Her video art piece Concealment was one of the selected shorts to be screened at the Iranian Film Festival in Los Angeles, and her experimental documentary Three Rituals of Perdurance was among the chosen shorts at the Currents New Media Festival 2015 in Santa Fe.

Other activities
Salome is also known as the first female graffiti artist in Iran, although she stopped writing graffiti in the early 2000s and focused on her music. She is also an educator and has organized workshops for children who were effected by the 2011 tsunami in Japan, and collaborates with Jack Straw Cultural Center in Seattle as a teaching artist. As a peace activist, she has spoken and written against militarism  and has joined on the advisory board of Code Pink after moving to the U.S.

Discography

Albums
 Seven Climes Vol. 1 (2021)
 Excerpts From Unhappy Consciousness (2017)
 I Officially Exist (2013)
 Paranoid Descent (Mixtape) (2009)
 Delirium Featuring Shirali (2006)

Compilations
 Karitha is featured on Nafada by Konqistador (2019)

Films
 Passenger (Music Documentary) (2015)
 Three Rituals of Perdurance (Experimental Documentary) (2014)

References

External links
 Official Website

1985 births
Living people
Iranian women rappers
21st-century Iranian women singers
Women video artists
Women record producers
Women activists
Women graffiti artists